is a Sapporo Municipal Subway station in Atsubetsu-ku, Sapporo, Hokkaido, Japan. The station number is T18.

Platforms

Surrounding area
 Hibarigaoka Atsubetsu Police Station
 Baba Park
 Post office Hibarigaoka Atsubetsu
 Town Plaza Hibarigaoka, shopping center
 HOMAC CORP. (main store)
 Hibarigaoka Hokuren store, CO-OP Sapporo Hibarigaoka branch

Gallery

External links

 Sapporo Subway Stations

 
 

Railway stations in Japan opened in 1982
Railway stations in Sapporo
Sapporo Municipal Subway